Sunderland College, officially City of Sunderland College, is a  further education and higher education college based in Sunderland, North East England. The enrolment includes around 6,300 part-time learners and approximately 4,800 full-time students. A report following a January 2010 Ofsted inspection awarded the school a Grade 2 (good) that included a Grade 1 (outstanding) on 3 inspection criteria.
The college is a member of the Collab Group of high performing schools.

About
The college is a multi-centre establishment, with three campuses throughout North East England, these are Bede Campus, City Campus, and Washington Campus. In addition to Hartlepool Sixth Form.

History
Statistically, Sunderland College has held the top position of colleges and sixth forms in Sunderland - achieving the best grades locally in comparison with St. Aidan's RC, St. Anthony's RC and St. Robert's of Newminster, in recent years.

Hartlepool Sixth Form merged with Sunderland College in September 2017 and in March 2019, Northumberland College merged with Sunderland College. This created Education Partnership North East, one of the largest college groups in the country.

Bede Campus

The college's Bede Campus, which is situated close to Sunderland City Centre on Durham Road (A690), is in the buildings of the former Bede School which began as Sunderland Higher Grade School in 1890 (near the West Park, now the site of Sunderland Civic Centre).  In 1905 the school was renamed Bede Collegiate School, with separate Boys and Girls' Schools, and in 1927 the foundation stones were laid for new school buildings on Durham Road, current site of Bede Campus of Sunderland College.  Following the 1944 Education Act the two schools became Grammar Schools: the Girls' School had around 500 girls in the 1950s, and by the 1960s the Boys' School had over 900 boys.  In 1971 Bede School became a co-educational non-selective Comprehensive School, closing in 1991 a year after celebrating its centenary.  Both the Boys' and Girls' Schools of the original school and the successor Comprehensive School were referred to, locally, as Bede School or 'The Bede'.

Bede Campus is the specialist centre for health and care, digital, A-Levels, sports and visual and performing arts courses.

It is home to a dedicated sixth form for academic study, science labs, health simulation ward, industry standard digital suite, state-of-the art Sports Academy and £11 million Arts Academy. The campus also includes a Goals Soccer Centre with all-weather 3G 5-a-side pitches.

City Campus

In the heart of Sunderland, the £30 million City Campus has an extensive range of industry-standard equipment for vocational study from specialist construction and engineering workshops to a simulated aircraft for Travel and Tourism students. In addition there is commercial hair, barbering and beauty salons, a travel agency, restaurant and kitchens.

Washington Campus

In September 2006, Sunderland College opened its brand-new £10 million Washington campus on Stone Cellar Road in Washington, Tyne and Wear, which then won the award for Public Sector Building of the Year at The Journal Landmark Awards. It is on the site of the former Usworth School just off the A195 near the junction with the A194(M) in Usworth and Concord.

Facilities
Each of the college's centres has its own Learning Centre where students can have access to networked computers, borrow books from the library, or a quiet place to study. Refectories, cafes, shops and common rooms are all available at each of the campuses.

There is also access to the media facilities and libraries of the University of Sunderland

Notable alumni

 George Clarke (architect) - Architect and television presenter
 Lauren Laverne - TV/radio personality and former presenter of the BBC's The Culture Show
 Gareth Pugh - fashion designer
The Futureheads - English post-punk band from Sunderland

Bede Grammar School for Boys

 Don Airey, Musician, Deep Purple, Whitesnake, Ozzy Osbourne..etc.
 Alan Brien, journalist
 Sir David Cairns, a former Lord Justice of Appeal from 1970–77
 Prof Alan Cowey F.R.S., Professor of Physiological Psychology at the University of Oxford from 1981–2002, and President of the European Brain and Behaviour Society from 1986-8
 Sir Tom Cowie OBE, transport entrepreneur
 Rod Culbertson, Actor
 Prof Samuel Newby Curle FRSE, mathematician
 Derek Foster, Baron Foster of Bishop Auckland, Labour MP for Bishop Auckland from 1979–2005
 Rt Rev David George Galliford, Bishop of Bolton from 1984–91
 Sydney Goldstein, Mathematics professor at the Victoria University of Manchester and aerodynamicist
 Sir David Harrison CBE, Vice-Chancellor of the University of Exeter from 1984–94 and the University of Keele from 1979–84
 Marcus Lipton CBE, Labour MP for Brixton from 1945–74, then Lambeth Central from 1974-8
 Prof James McFarlane, Professor of European Literature from 1964-82 at the University of East Anglia
 David Parfitt, film producer
 David Rock, architect and President of RIBA from 1986-7 and 1995-7
 Dave Stewart, Musician, Eurythmics.
 Sir James Taylor MBE, physicist and President of the Institute of Physics from 1966-8
 Neville Thurlbeck, chief reporter for News of the World and reporter of the Beckham/Loos affair
 Prof Alan Woodruff CMG OBE, Wellcome Professor of Clinical Tropical Medicine from 1952-81 at the London School of Hygiene and Tropical Medicine

References

External links
 

Education in the City of Sunderland
Further education colleges in Tyne and Wear
Sunderland